On My Way to Church is the debut studio album by American hip hop recording artist Jim Jones. The album was released on August 24, 2004, by Diplomat Records and Koch Records. The album debuted at number 18 on the Billboard 200, with 44,000 copies sold in the first week released.

Track listing

Charts

Weekly charts

Year-end charts

References

2004 debut albums
Jim Jones (rapper) albums
Diplomat Records albums
Albums produced by the Heatmakerz